is Beni's sixth single under the label Nayutawave Records. The leading song contains a sample of the piano from Yumi Matsutoya's 1994 song "Haru yo, Koi". The first press bonus will include a BENIxMURUA collaborative interchangeable jacket and for a lucky group of fifty, they will be awarded with a BENIxMURUA collaborative T-shirt. The single charted at the weekly spot #50 and sold 1,596 copies.

Track list

References

2010 singles
Beni (singer) songs
2010 songs
Songs written by Yumi Matsutoya